Newton Lee is a computer scientist who is an author and administrator in the field of education and technology commercialization. He is known for his total information awareness book series.

Education

Lee holds a B.S. and M.S. in computer science from Virginia Tech, and an electrical engineering degree and honorary doctorate from Vincennes University. He was a 2021 graduate of the FBI Citizens Academy and the founding president of the Los Angeles chapter of the Virginia Tech Alumni Association.

Career

Lee is editor and curator of SpringerBriefs in Computer Science, Springer International Series on Computer Entertainment and Media Technology, and Springer Encyclopedia of Computer Graphics and Games.

Previously, Lee was adjunct professor of Media Technology at Woodbury University, senior producer and lead engineer at The Walt Disney Company, research scientist at VTLS where he created the world's first annotated multimedia OPAC for the U.S. National Agricultural Library, computer science and artificial intelligence researcher at AT&T Bell Laboratories where he created Bell Labs' first-ever commercial AI tool, and research staff member at the Institute for Defense Analyses conducting military-standard Ada research for the U.S. Department of Defense (DoD).

In 2003, Lee founded the nonprofit Computers in Entertainment. It was published by the Association for Computing Machinery (ACM) for which Lee interviewed Roy E. Disney, Quincy Jones, and George Lucas. He oversaw the journal and magazine for 15 years from 2003 to 2018, which is the longest term held as editor-in-chief in the history of ACM.

Bibliography

Encyclopedia
Encyclopedia of Computer Graphics and Games (2018),

Academic books
Disney Stories: Getting to Digital, 2nd Edition (2020), with Krystina Madej, 
The Transhumanism Handbook (2019), 
Emotion in Video Game Soundtracking (2018), with Duncan Williams, 
Game Dynamics: Best Practices in Procedural and Dynamic Game Content Generation (2017), with Oliver Korn, 
Digital Da Vinci: Computers in the Arts and Sciences (2014), 
Digital Da Vinci: Computers in Music (2014), 
Disney Stories: Getting to Digital (2012), with Krystina Madej,

Total information awareness book series
Facebook Nation: Total Information Awareness, 3rd Edition (2021), 
Google It: Total Information Awareness (2016),  
Counterterrorism and Cybersecurity: Total Information Awareness, 2nd Edition (2015), 
Facebook Nation: Total Information Awareness, 2nd Edition (2014), 
Counterterrorism and Cybersecurity: Total Information Awareness (2013),  
Facebook Nation: Total Information Awareness (2012),

Movies, games, and music

Lee was credited as a software engineer for Disney's Animated Storybooks (1994 video game) (featured on Billboard) and Pocahontas (1996 video game).

Lee was also credited for web design and game development for the 2015 documentary film Finding Noah: The Search for Noah's Ark.

Lee has executive produced dance-pop songs that have charted on U.S. Billboard, U.K. Music Week, and U.S. iTunes HOT 100 (Electronic) as well as appeared on American Idol and Lifetime original movie Cheyenne.

In 2016, he curated and released the Google It (Soundtrack) music album consisting of Roger Hodgson's The Logical Song, Princess X's Free, and six cover songs from the Beatles, the Eagles, R.E.M., Pink Floyd, and Zager and Evans.

Politics

Lee is the chairman of the California Transhumanist Party and the Education and Media Advisor for the United States Transhumanist Party. Previously, he was a campaign advisor to Zoltan Istvan for the 2016 U.S. presidential election.

Philanthropy

Lee is the founding president of the 501(c)(3) nonprofit Institute for Education, Research, and Scholarships (IFERS) acknowledged by Alan Kay and Quincy Jones at the American Film Institute on November 4, 2006 during the Computers in Entertainment awards ceremony as well as by Senator Richard D. Roth of the California State Senate on March 14, 2016 in support of Type 1 diabetes awareness and research.

On Earth Day on April 22, 2018, Lee was a member of the IFERS-sponsored 2018 Earth Day Peace Conference and Movie Screening.

Advisory boards

Lee has served on the advisory boards at Virginia Tech, University of Southern California, National University of Singapore, Murdoch University, Digital Hollywood, and the High School Music Company.

References

External links

Newton Lee
Institute for Education, Research, and Scholarships (IFERS)
California Transhumanist Party
ACM Computers in Entertainment

American transhumanists
Living people
American computer scientists
American online publication editors
Virginia Tech alumni
Vincennes University alumni
Year of birth missing (living people)